The 1896 Rutgers Queensmen football team represented Rutgers University as an independent during the 1896 college football season. In their first season under head coach John C. B. Pendleton, the Queensmen compiled a 6–6 record and were outscored by their opponents, 226 to 74. The team captain was John N. Mills.

Schedule

References

Rutgers
Rutgers Scarlet Knights football seasons
Rutgers Queensmen football